George Lockwood (born 6 December 1872, date of death unknown) was an Australian rules footballer who played for the Geelong Football Club and Collingwood Football Club in the Victorian Football League (VFL). He was originally from the Geelong area, but came to the VFL from the East Fremantle Football Club.

Family
The sons of Thomas Lockwood (1821-1876), and Charlotte Lockwood (1843-1884), née Chambers (later Mrs. William Moorhouse Hardman), George Lockwood and his twin brother Edward Lockwood (1872–1953) were born at Geelong on 6 December 1872.

Football
George and his twin brother "Teddy" were the first pair of twins to play VFL football. Their careers also mirrored each other's, with both starting at Geelong in 1899 and crossing to Collingwood in 1902. George Lockwood usually played in the back pocket and was a member of Collingwood premiership sides in 1902 and 1903.

References

External links 

 
 George Lockwood, at Collingwood Forever''

1872 births
Year of death missing
Geelong Football Club (VFA) players
Geelong Football Club players
Collingwood Football Club players
Collingwood Football Club Premiership players
East Fremantle Football Club players
Australian rules footballers from Geelong
Australian twins
Twin sportspeople
Two-time VFL/AFL Premiership players